Andreas  was appointed Coadjutor Bishopof Clogher  in 1500.

References

15th-century Roman Catholic bishops in Ireland
Pre-Reformation bishops of Clogher